The 1900 North Carolina A&M Aggies football team represented the North Carolina A&M Aggies of North Carolina College of Agriculture and Mechanic Arts during the 1900 college football season. In John McKee's first season as head coach, the Aggies lost to four opponents for the first time in program history, and scoring only seven points all season and allowing 64.

Schedule

References

North Carolina AandM
NC State Wolfpack football seasons
College football winless seasons
North Carolina AandM Aggies football